Orton Community Sixth Form is a consortium sixth form for Bushfield Community College and Orton Longueville School.

See also
List of schools in Peterborough

References

Education in Peterborough